Southeastern was a United States Postal Service regional Processing and Distribution Center (P&DC) in Tredyffrin Township, Chester County, Pennsylvania, United States, near Devon.  It was primarily known for its post mark on mail originating in many ZIP codes in the region.  The retail post office remains open at the location of the former P&DC.  

Many bills for Verizon Communications and Comcast as well as statements from The Vanguard Group are sent from this post office.  Videos for Netflix were also sent from this post office for customers in the Philadelphia region.  This post office served as the regional mail center for the 193xx group of zip codes and post offices, and much of the mail from this area to the rest of the country bore a Southeastern, PA 193xx postmark instead of the actual zip code of origin.

Prior to closing, Southeastern processing was being studied for consolidation with other facilities due to the excess capacity in the postal network.  On September 8, 2010, notice was given to the postal union of possible consolidation with the Lehigh Valley P&DC.
On September 15, 2011, the USPS announced that they were studying a consolidation into the Philadelphia P&DC.  A public meeting was held on January 3, 2012.  According to a published summary of the study, "retail and other services currently available at the Southeastern facility will not change at this time."

The Southeastern P&DC was consolidated into the Philadelphia P&DC in 2012–2013.

References

External links
Southeastern, PA post office locator

United States Postal Service
Buildings and structures in Chester County, Pennsylvania